Salavat may refer to:

Places
Salavat, Afghanistan, an inhabited locality in Afghanistan
Salavat, Iran, a village in Ardabil Province, Iran
Salavat Rural District, in Ardabil Province, Iran
Salavat Urban Okrug, a municipal formation into which the city of republic significance of Salavat in the Republic of Bashkortostan, Russia is incorporated
Salavat, Russia, a city in the Republic of Bashkortostan, Russia

Others
Salawat, meaning "peace be upon him", a phrase often used after the name of a prophet of Islam
5546 Salavat, an asteroid discovered in 1979

See also
 Salavat Yulaev (disambiguation)